The 18th constituency of Budapest is one of the single member constituencies of the National Assembly, the national legislature of Hungary. The constituency standard abbreviation: Budapest 18. OEVK.

Since 2018, it has been represented by Gyula Molnár of the Fidesz–KDNP party alliance.

Geography
The 2nd constituency is located in southern part of Buda.

The constituency borders with 2nd constituency to the north, 6th- and 17th constituency to the east, 8th constituency of Pest County to the south, 1st- and 2nd constituency of Pest County to the west.

List of districts
The constituency includes the following municipalities:

 District XXII.: Full part of the district.
 District XI.: Southern part (Nándorkert, Albertfalva, Kelenvölgy and Péterhegy) of the district.

History
The 2nd constituency of Budapest was created in 2011 and contained of the pre-2011 abolished constituencies of the part of 16th and 32nd constituency of the capital. Its borders have not changed since its creation.

Members
The constituency was first represented by Attila Szabolcs of the Fidesz from 2014 to 2018. Gyula Molnár of the MSZP was elected in 2018.

Election result

2022 election

2018 election

2014 election

References

Budapest 18th